jQT (formerly jQTouch) is an open-source Zepto/ JQuery plugin with native animations, automatic navigation, and themes for mobile WebKit browsers like iPhone, G1 (Android), and Palm Pre. It enables programmers to develop mobile applications with a native look and feel for the target device using HTML, CSS, and JavaScript.

jQT tries to emulate mobile platforms, like the iOS SDK, as much as possible even enabling the use of the Webkit application offline.

See also 
 JQuery
 iUI
 JQuery Mobile

External links
 jqtjs.com (formerly jQTouch) home
 jQTouch Github source archive

References 

 
 
 

JavaScript libraries